Axel Westermark (April 8, 1875 – May 7, 1911) was an American sailor serving in the United States Navy during the Boxer Rebellion who received the Medal of Honor for bravery.

Biography
Westermark was born April 8, 1875, in Finland. After entering the navy he was sent as an Seaman to China to fight in the Boxer Rebellion.

He died May 7, 1911, in California. He was initially buried in the former Puget Sound Navy Yard Cemetery; his remains now lie in San Francisco National Cemetery.

Medal of Honor citation
Rank and organization: Seaman, U.S. Navy. Born: 8 April 1875, Finland. Accredited to: California. G.O. No.: 55, 19 July 1901.

Citation:

In the presence of the enemy during the battle of Peking, China, 28 June to 17 August 1900. Throughout this period, Westermark distinguished himself by meritorious conduct.

See also

List of Medal of Honor recipients
List of Medal of Honor recipients for the Boxer Rebellion

References

External links

1875 births
1911 deaths
United States Navy Medal of Honor recipients
United States Navy sailors
American military personnel of the Boxer Rebellion
Foreign-born Medal of Honor recipients
Boxer Rebellion recipients of the Medal of Honor
Burials at San Francisco National Cemetery
Finnish emigrants to the United States (1809–1917)